Neurophysiology is a branch of physiology and neuroscience that studies nervous system function rather than nervous system architecture. This area aids in the diagnosis and monitoring of neurological diseases. Historically, it has been dominated by electrophysiology—the electrical recording of neural activity ranging from the molar (the electroencephalogram, EEG) to the cellular (intracellular recording of the properties of single neurons), such as patch clamp, voltage clamp, extracellular single-unit recording and recording of local field potentials. However, since the neurone is an electrochemical machine, it is difficult to isolate electrical events from the metabolic and molecular processes that cause them. Thus, neurophysiologists currently utilise tools from chemistry (calcium imaging), physics (functional magnetic resonance imaging, fMRI), and molecular biology (site directed mutations) to examine brain activity.

The word originates from the Greek word  meaning "nerve" and physiology meaning knowledge about the function of living systems (φύσις meaning "nature" and -λογία meaning "knowledge").

History

Neurophysiology has been a subject of study since as early as 4,000 B.C.

In the early B.C. years, most studies were of different natural sedatives like alcohol and poppy plants. In 1700 B.C., the Edwin Smith surgical papyrus was written. This papyrus was crucial in understanding how the ancient Egyptians understood the nervous system.  This papyrus looked at different case studies about injuries to different parts of the body, most notably the head. Beginning around 460 B.C., Hippocrates began to study epilepsy, and theorized that it had its origins in the brain. Hippocrates also theorized that the brain was involved in sensation, and that it was where intelligence was derived from.  Hippocrates, as well as most ancient Greeks, believed that relaxation and a stress free environment was crucial in helping treat neurological disorders. In 280 B.C., Erasistratus of Chios theorized that there were divisions in vestibular processing in the brain, as well as deducing from observation that sensation was located there.

In 177 Galen theorized that human thought occurred in the brain, as opposed to the heart as Aristotle had theorized. The optic chiasm, which is crucial to the visual system, was discovered around 100 C.E. by Marinus. Circa 1000, Al-Zahrawi, living in Iberia, began to write about different surgical treatments for neurological disorders. In 1216, the first anatomy textbook in Europe, which included a description of the brain, was written by Mondino de Luzzi. In 1402, St Mary of Bethlehem Hospital (later known as Bedlam in Britain) was the first hospital used exclusively for the mentally ill.

In 1504, Leonardo da Vinci continued his study of the human body with a wax cast of the human ventricle system. In 1536, Nicolo Massa described the effects of different diseases, such as syphilis on the nervous system. He also noticed that the ventricular cavities were filled with cerebrospinal fluid. In 1542, the term physiology was used for the first time by a French physician named Jean Fernel, to explain bodily function in relation to the brain. In 1543, Andreas Vesalius wrote De humani corporis fabrica, which revolutionized the study of anatomy. In this book, he described the pineal gland and what he believed the function was, and was able to draw the corpus striatum which is made up of the basal ganglia and the internal capsule. In 1549, Jason Pratensis published De Cerebri Morbis. This book was devoted to neurological diseases, and discussed symptoms, as well as ideas from Galen and other Greek, Roman and Arabic authors. It also looked into the anatomy and specific functions of different areas. In 1550, Andreas Vesalius worked on a case of hydrocephalus, or fluid filling the brain. In the same year, Bartolomeo Eustachi studied the optic nerve, mainly focusing on its origin in the brain. In 1564, Giulio Cesare Aranzio discovered the hippocampus, naming it such due to its shape resemblance to a sea horse.

In 1621, Robert Burton published The Anatomy of Melancholy, which looked at the loss of important characters in one's life as leading to depression. In 1649, René Descartes studied the pineal gland. He mistakenly believed that it was the "soul" of the brain, and believed it was where thoughts formed. In 1658, Johann Jakob Wepfer studied a patient in which he believed that a broken blood vessel had caused apoplexy, or a stroke.

In 1749, David Hartley published Observations on Man, which focused on frame (neurology), duty (moral psychology) and expectations (spirituality) and how these integrated within one another. This text was also the first to use the English term psychology. In 1752, the Society of Friends created an asylum in Philadelphia, Pennsylvania. The asylum intended to give not only medical treatment to those mentally ill, but also provide with caretakers and comfortable living conditions. In 1755, Jean-Baptiste Le Roy began using electroconvulsive therapy for the mentally ill, a treatment still used today in specific cases. In 1760, Arne-Charles studied how different lesions in the cerebellum could affect motor movements. In 1776,  studied the cerebellum intensely, and published a book solely based on its function and appearance.

In 1784, Félix Vicq-d'Azyr, discovered a black colored structure in the midbrain. In 1791 Samuel Thomas von Sömmerring alluded to this structure, calling it the substantia nigra.  In the same year, Luigi Galvani described the role of electricity in nerves of dissected frogs.  In 1808, Franz Joseph Gall studied and published work on phrenology. Phrenology was the faulty science of looking at head shape to determine different aspects of personality and brain function. In 1811, Julien Jean César Legallois studied respiration in animal dissection and lesions and found the center of respiration in the medulla oblongata. In the same year, Charles Bell finished work on what would later become known as the Bell–Magendie law, which compared functional differences between dorsal and ventral roots of the spinal cord. In 1822, Karl Friedrich Burdach distinguished between the lateral and medial geniculate bodies, as well as named the cingulate gyrus. In 1824, F. Magendie studied and produced the first evidence of the cerebellum's role in equilibration to complete the Bell–Magendie law. In 1838, Theodor Schwann began studying white and grey matter in the brain, and discovered the myelin sheath. These cells, which cover the axons of the neurons in the brain, are named Schwann cells after him. In 1848, Phineas Gage, the classical neurophysiology patient, had his brain pierced by an iron tamping rod in a blasting accident. He became an excellent case study in the connection between the prefrontal cortex and behavior, decision making and consequences. In 1849, Hermann von Helmholtz studied the speed of frog nerve impulses while studying electricity in the body.

While these are not all the developments in neurophysiology before 1849, these developments were significant to the study of the brain and body.

See also
Brain
Neuroscience
Neural coding
Neurology
Repetitive visual stimulus

References

Sources